The 1993 winners of the Torneo di Viareggio (in English, the Viareggio Tournament, officially the Viareggio Cup World Football Tournament Coppa Carnevale), the annual youth football tournament held in Viareggio, Tuscany, are listed below.

Format
The 24 teams are seeded in 6 groups. Each team from a group meets the others in a single tie. The winning club and runners-up from each group progress to the second round. In the second round teams are split up in two groups and meet in a single tie (with penalties after regular time). Winners progress to the final knockout stage, along with the best losing team from each group. The final round matches include 30 minutes extra time and penalties to be played if the draw between teams still holds. The semifinals losing sides play consolation final. The winning teams play the final with extra time and repeat the match if the draw holds.

Participating teams
Italian teams

  Atalanta
  Cosenza
  Empoli
  Fiorentina
  Genoa
  Inter Milan
  Juventus
  Milan
  Modena
  Napoli
  Padova
  Parma
  Perugia
  Reggiana
  Torino
  Taranto
  Udinese
  Venezia

European teams

  Bayer 04 Leverkusen
  Leeds United
  Metz

American teams

  Pumas
  Palmeiras

Asian teams
  Yomiuri

Group stage

Group 1

Group 2

Group 3

Group 4

Group 5

Group 6

Second round

Knockout stage

Champions

Footnotes

External links
 Official Site (Italian)
 Results on RSSSF.com

1993
1993–94 in Italian football
1993–94 in English football
1993–94 in French football
1993–94 in German football
1993–94 in Mexican football
1993 in Japanese football
1993 in Brazilian football